Spires That in the Sunset Rise is an American psychedelic folk band from Decatur, Illinois. The four original members of the band (Ka Baird, Georgia Vallas, Taralie Peterson, and Tracy Peterson) grew up together in Decatur, Illinois, eventually moving to Chicago, Illinois where they began to experiment with creating songs. Drawing from experimental and multi-cultural music, they created an individual sound which they debuted on their first self-titled album Spires That in the Sunset Rise.

The first album was created without Taralie's sister Tracy Peterson, but she soon joined the group before the making of their second album 'Four Winds the Walker.' A year later they created their third album 'This Is Fire' which today is considered one of their most accessible albums thus far. Since the release of their first album, they have contributed a different slant to the New Folk movement by incorporating avant garde influences resulting in a unique sound. Their music has drawn comparisons to The Raincoats, Current 93, Comus, and The Ex, and they have toured throughout the United States, Canada, and Europe.

In 2012 the band (now a duo of long-term members Ka Baird and Taralie Peterson) released their fifth full-length album, 'Ancient Patience Wills It Again'

The band
Ka Baird: Lead vocals #1, spike fiddle, acoustic guitar, mbira, slide guitar, harmonium, electric guitar, organ, xylophone, percussion, drums, banjo
Taralie Peterson: Lead Vocals #2, Vocals, slide guitar, lap harp, bowed banjo, spike fiddle, cello, banjo, mbira, zither, electric guitar
Georgia Vallas (former member): Back-up vocals, autoharp, percussion, lap banjo, slide guitar, recorder, zither, bowed banjo, Turkish lap banjo, harmonium, drums, lap slide
Tracy Peterson (former member): Back-up vocals, percussion, guitar, cello, little harp, drums, mbira, thumb piano, washboard, rattlers, tambourine

Discography
Spires That in the Sunset Rise (Graveface Records, 2004)
Four Winds the Walker (Secret Eye, 2005)
This Is Fire (Secret Eye, 2006)
Curse the Traced Bird (Secret Eye, 2008)
Ancient Patience Wills It Again (Hairy Spider Legs, 2012)
Beasts In The Garden (Alt Vinyl, 2015)

References

External links
Secret Eye Biography on Spires That in the Sunset Rise
Spires That in the Sunset Rise interview by Splendid Zine
Spires That in the Sunset Rise Official Myspace page
Spires That in the Sunset Rise interview by IdentityTheory
[ Spires That in the Sunset Rise on allmusic.com]

Psychedelic folk groups
Musical groups from Illinois
New Weird America